The 2001–02 Gonzaga Bulldogs men's basketball team (also informally referred to as the Zags) represented Gonzaga University in the 2001–02 NCAA Division I men's basketball season. The team was led by head coach Mark Few, in his 3rd season as head coach, and played their home games at the Charlotte Y. Martin Centre in Spokane, Washington. This was the Bulldogs' 22nd season as a member of the West Coast Conference. After winning the WCC tournament for the fourth straight season, the team earned an automatic bid to the NCAA tournament.

Roster

Schedule and results

|-
!colspan=9| Regular season

|-
!colspan=9| 2002 West Coast Conference tournament

|-
!colspan=9| NCAA Division I men's basketball tournament

Rankings

Awards and honors
Dan Dickau – Consensus First-team All-American, WCC Player of the Year
Mark Few – WCC Coach of the Year

References

Gonzaga Bulldogs
Gonzaga Bulldogs men's basketball seasons
Gonzaga Bulldogs men's basketball
Gonzaga Bulldogs men's basketball
Gonzaga